Longview is an American bluegrass supergroup that was formed in 1995. The group's name is derived from the Long View Recording Studio complex in North Brookfield, Massachusetts, where they recorded their first album.

Band members
James King - guitar, vocals
Lou Reid - guitar, vocals
Don Rigsby - mandolin
Ron Stewart - fiddle
J. D. Crowe - banjo
Marshall Wilborn - bass

Original
Dudley Connell
Glen Duncan 
James King
Joe Mullins
Don Rigsby
Marshall Wilborn

Discography

Albums
 1997: Longview (Rounder)
 1999: High Lonesome (Rounder)
 2002: Lessons in Stone (Rebel)
 2008: Deep in the Mountains (Rounder)

References

American bluegrass music groups
Rebel Records artists